The following is a list of notable events and releases of the year 1976 in Norwegian music.

Events

April
 9 – The 3rd Vossajazz started in Voss, Norway (April 9 – 11).

May
 19
 The 24th Bergen International Festival started in Bergen, Norway (May 19 – June 2).
 The 4th Nattjazz started in Bergen, Norway (May 19 – June 2).

June
 20 – The 7th Kalvøyafestivalen started at Kalvøya near by Oslo.

Albums released

Unknown date

B
 Odd Børretzen
 På Den Ene Siden (Camp Records), with Julius Hougen

E
 Jan Eggum
 Trubadur (CBS Records)

F
 Flying Norwegians
 Wounded Bird (Sonet Records)

K
 Karin Krog
 Different Days Different Ways (Philips Records)
 Hi-Fly (Compendium Records) with Archie Shepp

N
 Bjarne Nerem
 Everything Happens To Me (RCA Victor)
 Lillebjørn Nilsen
 Hei-Fara! (Polydor Records)

R
 Terje Rypdal
 After the Rain (ECM)

S
 Øystein Sunde
 På Sangens Vinger (Philips Records)

Deaths

 February
 20 – Erling Kjellsby, organist and composer (born 1901).

 April
 30 – Edvard Fliflet Bræin, composer and music conductor (born 1924).

 June
 6 – Ragnar Danielsen, pianist and composer (born 1917).
 7 – Leif Rustad, cellist and radio pioneer (born 1903).

 September
 6 – Berit Brænne, actress, children's writer and songwriter (born 1918).

Births

 January
 10 – Freddy Wike, jazz drummer.
 22 – Sivert Høyem, vocalist, Madrugada.

 February
 13 — Thomas Hansen, musician known as "Saint Thomas" (died 2007).
 14 – Liv Kristine Espenæs, singer/songwriter.
 22 – Ian Kenneth Åkesson, black metal drummer, Dimmu Borgir.
 26 – Karl Strømme, jazz trumpeter.

 March
 1 – Andreas Mjøs, multi-instrumentalist, record producer and composer, Jaga Jazzist.
 10 – Ane Brun, singer and songwriter.
 13 – Marianne Thorsen, classical violinist.
 16 – Erlend Jentoft, saxophonist and composer.
 19 – Thom Hell, singer and songwriter.
 22 – Marita Solberg, soprano.

 April
 10 – Jan Werner Danielsen, singer (died 2006).
 17 – Kjetil Steensnæs, jazz guitarist.
 28 – Ivar "Ravi" Johansen, vocalist, keyboardist, trumpeter, composer, journalist and program manager.

 May
 13 – Lars Nedland, black metal vocalist, drummer, and keyboardist, Solefald.

 June
 3
 Hilde Louise Asbjørnsen, jazz singer, songwriter, cabaret artist.
 Roger Arntzen, jazz upright bassist, In The Country.
 14 – Brynjard Tristan, bassist and songwriter.
 17 – Kjetil Møster, jazz saxophonist and clarinetist and composer.
 21 – Jarle Bernhoft, singer, multi-instrumentalist, composer and lyricist.
 25 – Desirée Sparre-Enger, bubblegum dance singer.

 July
 14 – Erik Dæhlin, composer and performance artist.

 August
 8 – Olaf Olsen, drummer, BigBang.

 September
 9 – Kristoffer Rygg, vocalist, keyboardist and programmer.
 25 – Morten "Opaque" Aasdahl Eliassen, rapper and songwriter.

 October
 1 – Ivar Grydeland, jazz guitarist and composer.
 10 – Stella Getz, pop singer.
 17 – Kjartan Salvesen, pop singer.
 19 – Jostein Gulbrandsen, jazz guitarist and composer.

 November
 13 – Nell Sigland, singer.
 18 – Stian Shagrath Thoresen, vocalist and multi instrumentalist, Dimmu Borgir.

 December
 6 – Ole Børud, singer, songwriter and instrumentalist.
 18 – Shaun Bartlett, singer, lyricist and composer.
 23 – Natalia Strelchenko, Russian born Norwegian concert pianist (died 2015).

 Unknown date
 Håkon Thelin, upright bass player and composer.
 Johannes Sæbøe, pop/rock guitarist.
 Kjell-Ole Haune, composer and music producer.
 Øyvind Torvund, composer.

See also
 1976 in Norway
 Music of Norway
 Norway in the Eurovision Song Contest 1976

References

 
Norwegian music
Norwegian
Music
1970s in Norwegian music